The fistball event at the World Games 2017 in Wrocław, Poland took place between the 22nd and the 25th of July.

Schedule

Qualification
A total of 6 teams will compete in the fistball event at the World Games 2017.

The 2015 Men's Fistball World Championships acted as the qualification tournament. Six teams qualified for the World Games.

Qualified teams

Preliminary round

|}

Knockout stage

Semifinals

|}

Fifth place game

|}

Third place game

|}

Final

Final ranking

References

External links
 Results book

2017
2017 World Games